The Liberty Hill School at Liberty Hill, near Fairview, Tennessee, was built c. 1915. Along with Forest Hills School and Liberty School, as of 1988 it was considered one of the three best surviving examples in Williamson County of one room schoolhouses built during 1900–1920.  Most of these schools, which once provided the majority of public education in the county, had been lost.

The school and a  property was listed on the National Register of Historic Places in 1988, at which time the school was vacant and used for hay storage.  It was delisted in 2022.

References

School buildings on the National Register of Historic Places in Tennessee
Buildings and structures in Williamson County, Tennessee
School buildings completed in 1915
One-room schoolhouses in Tennessee
National Register of Historic Places in Williamson County, Tennessee
1915 establishments in Tennessee
Former National Register of Historic Places in Tennessee